Andagua District is one of fourteen districts of the province Castilla in Peru.

Geography 
Some of the highest mountains of the district are listed below:

References

Districts of the Castilla Province
Districts of the Arequipa Region